Daniel Rojas (born 1988) is a Costa Rican musician and composer primarily working in the fields of film and television.

Biography
Born in Heredia, Costa Rica into a musical family, Rojas studied Jazz Arranging & Composition at the University of North Texas in Denton, Texas on scholarship. After graduating in 2010, he moved full-time into session player work, primarily as a guitarist. His film and television work has included working as an assistant composer, arranger, and music team member for composers such as Hans Zimmer, Klaus Badelt, and Alan Menken. Rojas also performed as a member of Demi Lovato's band, and also worked as a guitarist on recordings by artists such as Bryan Adams and Jason Mraz, among others.

Session work eventually gave way to composing and arranging scores and songs for movies and television shows. His film projects have included songwriting for Money Monster (2016), directed by Jodie Foster and starring Foster and George Clooney, and Downsizing (2017), directed by Alexander Payne and starring Matt Damon. Television composition work has included scores for The Demon Files featuring Sean Astin (2015, Destination America), and True Nightmares featuring Tim Robbins (2015–2018, Investigation Discovery).

Currently, Rojas is the series composer for Kipo and the Age of Wonderbeasts, a DreamWorks Animation television series. He composes both score music and songs for the series, which stars the voices of Karen Fukuhara, Deon Cole, Coy Stewart, Sydney Mikayla, and Dee Bradley Baker. The first season of Kipo debuted on Netflix on January 14, 2020, with the Kipo and the Age of Wonderbeasts (Season 1 Mixtape) soundtrack album debuting a few days earlier on January 10. Both his music composition and production company, 506 Music, and his music library production company, Nimble Music (co-owned with Jack Gravina), are based out of Culver City, California.

Selected filmography

Film

Television

References

External links
Official website

506 Music
Nimble Music

1988 films
Costa Rican film score composers
Male film score composers
Living people
University of North Texas College of Music alumni
1988 births